Eoin Patrick Monahan (born 10 June 1967) is an Irish former footballer.

He joined Shamrock Rovers in August 1985 from St Josephs Boys making his league debut on the 12th of January 1986.

Monaghan was the last substitute to ever appear at Glenmalure Park.

He made a total of 21 appearances for the Hoops including one in the European Champion Clubs' Cup at Parkhead against Celtic.

In August 1987 he received a full scholarship to Seton Hall University and is now a financial advisor based in New Jersey

Honours
 League of Ireland:
 Shamrock Rovers 1986/87
 FAI Cup:
 Shamrock Rovers 1987

References

Further reading 
 The Hoops by Paul Doolan and Robert Goggins
 The Four-in-a-Row Story by Robert Goggins

Republic of Ireland association footballers
Shamrock Rovers F.C. players
League of Ireland players
1967 births
Living people
Seton Hall Pirates men's soccer players
Irish emigrants to the United States
Association footballers not categorized by position
Republic of Ireland expatriate association footballers
Irish expatriate sportspeople in the United States
Expatriate soccer players in the United States